The Anti-Group Communications (often referred to as The Anti-Group or T.A.G.C.)  is an open-membership collaborative art and information project formed in 1978 by Adi Newton and Steven Turner. The T.A.G.C. acronym refers to the four different types of DNA Nucleotide: thymine, adenine, guanine, and cytosine.  The group's main objective was to combine interactive and mixed media art, installations, and research on psycho acoustics and philosophical concepts to produce fascinating presentations. Although the group disbanded in 1996, Newton continued the project with CD releases and live performances in 2009.

T.A.G.C. audio recordings are released on Newton's Anterior Research Recordings label. The psychoacoustic experiments and carefully constructed aural rituals are usually accompanied by lengthy liner notes, explaining the theoretical underpinnings of the recordings. In this way, T.A.G.C. presents itself explicitly as acoustic research rather than music.

Works

Live performances

 Pandora's Box "Der Doelen" center in Rotterdam, Holland, Sat. 22 Sep 1984pandora's music box
 2nd Atonal festival "The Ballhaus Tiergarten" Berlin, Germany. 18 Feb 1985 
 3rd Atonal Festival "TU Mensa" Berlin, Germany on 13 Dec 1986
 The Pump Station SO 36" Berlin, Germany 14 Feb 1987
 Museum of Contemporary Art Prato, Italy Sept 23rd, 1988
 Electro-Acoustic Music Academy Stockholm, Sweden 23 Aug 1990
 ARS Electronica symposium on Virtual Reality 8 Sep 1990 Linz, Austria
 National Art Gallery V&A inclusion. Smile Classified a magazine of multiple origins March/August 1992 London.UK I.C.A.
 Art Futura Museo Nacional Centro De Arte Reina Sofia, Madrid, Spain, Sept 1994
 Equinox Festival 14 June Conway Hall, London, 2009
 TAGC SPECIAL PERFORMANCE EVENT THE CUBE / WGT Festival Leipzig Fri 10 June 2010 e.v.MMXI
 XWIF: 10.11.11 T.A.G.C. - Wroclaw: BWA art gallery
 Live Sono Visual Projection Invocation Integration in Ambisonics The Denizens. From the Meontological Research Recording 3 Transmission from the Trans-Yoggothian Broadcast Station
 ATRIBUTETOJGBALLARD–,T.A.G.C.,PARADISO,AMSTERDAM -8/9/2012
 TAGC live performance The Cube @ INCUBATE SEPT 22ND 2013. De NWE Vorst The new King Theater
 Willem II straat 49, 5038 BD, Tilburg.
 PERSUASION: Musique industrielle et contrôle mental / Exhibition inclusion jeudi 2 avril 2015
 Exposition le 3 et 4 et les 15, 16, 17 et 18 avril 2015 de 15h à 19h
 Vernissage le 2 avril 2015 dès 19h 
 Précédé d’une journée de conférences dans le cadre du projet de recherche MIND CONTROL, Radical experiments in art and psychology Design Project Room  Bâtiment HEAD La Prairie Rue de Lyon 22, 1201 Genève mercredi au samedi de 14 à 19h
 TAGC / CAFE OTO - 10 / 12 / 15 Meontological Research Recordings Experimental works 1985 / 2014
 Mark Fell Curation / Reality Check with Thomas Metzinger
 TAGC / Visual staging
 Geräuschwelten Festival in The Black Box 08.05.2016: TAGC (The Anti Group) Münster
 TAGC / MATAR / MYKEL BOYD 06 /10/16 @ The Burlington Chicago, IL and 07 /10/16 @ Feed Arts Centre Kankakee, IL. The USA.
 OCT 13TH / TAG PRESENTATION NEW PLATZ STATE UNIVERSITY OF NEW YORK / MUSIC FACILITY
 TAGC / FRI 2ND NOV 2017 / SPRINGDALE STATION AUSTIN TEXAS
 DIMENSIONS GALLERY 2017 / AUSTIN TEXAS NOV 3RD TAG SPECIAL PERFORMANCE SOUND PIECE AND DOCUMENTIVE EXHIBITION

Discography

 1985 - The Delivery - Atonal Records LP ST3006
 1985 - Ha/Zulu - Sweatbox 12" SOX009
 1986 - ShT - Sweatbox 12" SEX010
 1986 - Digitaria - Sweatbox LP SAX012 / CD SACD012 / Cass SAXC012
 1987 - Meontological Research Recording - Record 1 - Sweatbox LP SAX013
 1987 - Big Sex - Sweatbox 12" SOX011 / 7" OX011
 1988 - Meontological Recordings - Record 2: Teste Tones - Side Effects LP SER12
 1989 - Broadcast Test - Wax Trax 12" WAX9104 / Big Sex Records 12" Big Sex 002
 1994 - Burning Water - Anterior Research Recordings CD ARR004 / Side Effects CD DFX17
 1994 - Iso-Erotic Calibrations - Anterior Research Recordings CD ARR003
 1994 - Audiophile - Anterior Research Recordings CD ARR001
 2005 - Psychoegoautocratical Auditory Physiogomy Delineated - Die Stadt maxi-CD DS67 (unofficial release)
 2018 - OBSOLETE CAPITALISM AND ADI NEWTON / TAG - CHAOS VARIATION III - VINYL 12 / 45 / NURKFM004 [ITA] 
 2018 - Matar / TAG - Sculptures Of Daedalus / Spiritual Psycho synthesis (Flexi, 7", Shape) - Anterior Research Media Comm FX1/FX2
 2020 - 4 X 12 CD / PERIPHERAL MINIMAL RECORDS / ARMComm / Peripheral Minimal PM27
 2020 - Organ Needles Limited Edition Box inc 1xUSB card  / CD / Anterior Research Media Comm – 005 / USB 02
 2021 - Meontological Research Recording III - Transmission from the Trans Yuggothian Broadcast Station / Anterior Research Media Comm - Rizosfera/NUKFM - NUBKFM 013 (Book + USB Card)
 2022 - AMMA / Armcomm Europe / Rizosfera CD

Compilations

 1986 - You Bet We've Got Something Against You - Cathexis LP
 1986 - Abstract Magazine Issue 6 - Sweatbox LP
 1986 - Berlin Atonal '86 - Cass
 1987 - Minutes To Go! - Interphon CD / Les Temps Modernes LP
 1988 - Provoke N° 3 - IMC Cass
 1988 - Bark - Sweatbox LP
 1989 - Funky Alternatives Vol. 4 - Concrete LP/CD
 1990 - Total Volume 1 - Total LP
 1991 - Project 91 - Hyperium CD
 1994 - Taste This 2 - Discordia CD
 1996 - Deepnet - Side Effects 2xCD
 1996 - Alternator - Concrete Productions 2xCD
 1997 - Exclusive Alternatives - Cleopatra CD
 1999 - Industrial Meltdown - Cleopatra 3xCD
 2000 - Industrial Rock - Edel America CD
 2010 - Antibothis Vol. 3 - Chili Com Carne / Thisco Book+CD
 2011 - Tesserae - Abraxas Journal 2 Audio Supplement - Fulgur Book+CD 
 2016 -   The Anti Group, Matar (4), Mykel Boyd - Phantom Airwaves Presents: (Flexi, 7", Shape, S/Sided, Single)	Somnimage	SOM100616
 2019 - ARMComm Sampler - Anterior Research Media Comm CD 003

References

 British industrial music groups
 British ambient music groups
 English electronic music groups
 Musical groups from Sheffield
 Soleilmoon artists

External links
The Anti Group Official Website
ARMComm Official Website